The Locustville Academy is a historic school building at 28055 Drummondtown Road in Locustville, Virginia.  It is a two-story wood-frame building, with a gabled roof and small square cupola with a flared roof and louvered belfry.  Built in 1859, it is a well-preserved example of a mid-19th century rural academy building.  It served as a private school from 1859 to 1879, and as a public school from 1908 to 1926, when the Accomack County schools were consolidated.  It was added to the National Register of Historic Places in 2016.

See also
National Register of Historic Places listings in Accomack County, Virginia

References

School buildings on the National Register of Historic Places in Virginia
School buildings completed in 1859
National Register of Historic Places in Accomack County, Virginia
1859 establishments in Virginia